Petunidin (Pt), like Europinidin and Malvidin, is derived from Delphinidin and is an O-methylated anthocyanidin of the 3-hydroxy type. It is a natural organic compound, a dark-red or purple water-soluble pigment found in many redberries including chokeberries (Aronia sp), Saskatoon berries (Amelanchier alnifolia) or different species of grape (for instance Vitis vinifera, or muscadine, Vitis rotundifolia), and also part of the pigments responsible for the petal colors in many flowers. This pigment gives the Indigo Rose tomatoes the majority of their deep purple color when the fruits are exposed to sunlight. The name of the molecule itself is derived from the word Petunia.

Biosynthesis
Petunidin could form in the exocarp of fruits from delphinidin, with an anthocyanin flavonoid O-methyltransferase (Catechol-O-methyl transferase) catalyzing the B-ring methylation and S-Adenosyl-L-methyl-3H methionine being the methyl group donor.

Glycosides 
Glycoside forms of petunidin are present in grape. These include :

 Petunidin-3-O-glucoside
 Petunidin-3-O-(6-p-coumaroyl) glucoside
 Petunidin-3-O-(6-p-acetyl) glucoside
 Petunidin-3-O-galactoside
 Petunidin-3-rutinoside

The bark of Commiphora angolensis contains petunidin-3-rhamnoglucoside.

Uses 
Petunidin is referred as E165f, E163 and following numbers corresponding to anthocyanins in the food coloring E number list.

See also 
 List of phytochemicals in food
 List of antioxidants in food

References 

O-methylated anthocyanidins